Ang Choulean (born 1 January 1949) is a Cambodian anthropologist.  He is a professor of historical anthropology at the Royal University of Fine Arts and formerly the director of the Department of culture of APSARA.

He earned a bachelor's degree in Archaeology in 1974 from Royal University of Fine Arts and a PhD in Anthropology in 1982 from École des Roches in France.

In 2011 Ang Choulean won the Grand Prize of Fukuoka Prize, becoming the second Khmer person after Chheng Phon in 1997 to win the prize.

Honours
  Order of the Rising Sun, 3rd Class, Gold Rays with Neck Ribbon (2022)

References

External links
 Khmer Spiritual Beliefs Brought to Life in a New Novel
 A Cambodian Anthropologist Explains the Culinary Culture of Angkor
 Preserving Angkor: Interview with Ang Choulean

Academic staff of Royal University of Fine Arts
Living people
Anthropology educators
Recipients of the Order of the Rising Sun, 3rd class
1949 births